Hong Linh Ha Tinh Football Club, simply known as Hong Linh Ha Tinh (HLHT) is a Vietnamese professional football club which is based in Hà Tĩnh, Vietnam. The club is named after the Hồng Lĩnh mountain, and for matching with the name of "neighbor" Song Lam Nghe An.

History
Hong Linh Ha Tinh FC was founded on 12 January 2019 after the relocation of Hanoi B Football Club to Hà Tĩnh, thus becoming the only professional football club in the province.

On 30 August 2019, the club won the 2019 V.League 2 before two rounds (20/22 rounds) and subsequently promotion to the V.League 1 for the 2020 season for the first time in the club's history. Hong Linh Ha Tinh managed to finish in eighth place in their debut season in the top tier.

Honours

National competitions
National League
V.League 2
 Winners (1): 2019
National Youth System
U-21 Championship
 Winners (1): 2016
U-19 Championship
 Winners (1): 2000

Season-by-season record

Current squad 
As of 17 January 2023

Kit suppliers and shirt sponsors

Managers
 Phạm Minh Đức (2016–2021)
 Nguyễn Thành Công (2021–now)

References

2015 establishments in Asia
Association football clubs established in 2015
Hà Tĩnh province
Football clubs in Vietnam